Ronald Leung Ding-bong,  OBE (born 20 January 1934) is a Hong Kong politician and businessman in banking.

Early life 
Leung was born in Hong Kong on 20 January 1934. Leung's family was in the banking business.

Education 
In 1959, Leung graduated from the University of Hong Kong with Bachelor of Medicine, Bachelor of Surgery.

Career 
Leung joined his family business of Kwong On Bank in 1978 as the chairman. Leung has also held many directorships in the public companies.

Leung was first appointed to the Urban Council in 1984. In 1991, he was elected chairman of the Urban Council. He was also appointed to serve in many public positions, including the Criminal and Law Enforcement Injuries Compensation Boards, the Town Planning Board and the Inland Revenue Board of Review Panel. Leung was appointed Justice of the Peace in 1985 and was awarded Officer of the Order of the British Empire (OBE).

In 1996, Leung became a member of the Selection Committee, a Beijing-controlled electoral college responsible for the elections of the Provisional Legislative Council and the first Chief Executive. Leung became the last chairman of the Urban Council when Chief Executive Tung Chee-hwa decided to abolish the Urban and Regional Councils in 1999.

References

1934 births
Living people
Members of the Urban Council of Hong Kong
Hong Kong bankers
Hong Kong medical doctors
Alumni of the University of Hong Kong
Officers of the Order of the British Empire
New Hong Kong Alliance politicians